Çeltikçi is a Turkish place name and may refer to the following places in Turkey:

Çeltikçi, a district in Burdur Province
Çeltikçi, Ankara, a town in Kızılcahamam district of Ankara Province
Çeltikçi, Anamur, a village in Anamur district of Mersin Province
Çeltikçi, İnegöl, a village in İnegöl district of Bursa Province
Çeltikçi, Mustafakemalpaşa a village in Mustafakemalpaşa of Bursa Province